Gonzalo Daniel Malán Arenas (born 8 April 1988) was an Uruguayan footballer. His last club was Mexican side Alebrijes de Oaxaca.

References
 
 

1988 births
Living people
People from Nueva Helvecia
Uruguayan footballers
Uruguayan expatriate footballers
Sud América players
C.A. Rentistas players
Rampla Juniors players
C.D. Antofagasta footballers
Chilean Primera División players
Expatriate footballers in Chile
Expatriate footballers in Argentina
Association football forwards